Neapolitan Turk is a 1953 Italian comedy film directed by Mario Mattoli and starring Totò.

Plot
The film is based on a play by the famous Neapolitan writer Eduardo Scarpetta, father of Eduardo and Peppino De Filippo and Titina De Filippo The story is set in Naples and Sorrento in the second half of 1800. The thief Felice Sciosciammocca (the surname in Naples means "one who is always with her mouth open in astonishment"; Felice means "Happy") together with the bandit Faina ("Weasel") escapes from prison and meets with a Turkish eunuch that he should go to Sorrento for a job. Don Felice kidnaps him and steals his letter of recommendation to get into the house of a rich businessman, so that gains a bit of money for him and for his accomplice. The man who had called the Turkish is the rich grocer Don Pasquale, being jealous of his wife and young daughter, betrothed to Don Carluccio holding a dowry, is to host the Turk and immediately test some suspicion. In fact, the Turk rather than look like an eunuch protector proves to be a great womanizer and causes the sympathy of all the girls in the town and the wrath of the young. Don Felice, forgetting appears Faina, have fun in monitoring the wife and daughter of Pasquale and Don Carluccio appears more and more restless by the net waste of his betrothed. In the following days Don Felice will be met with the Honourable MP Cocchetelli who had recommended the real Turk to Don Pasquale, but cannot reveal the truth because Don Felice surprised him with a girl who was not his wife. On the day of the wedding, don Carluccio, after an engagement party gone wrong, stormed into the house of Don Pasquale to beat him, but Don Felice intervenes and gives the marching orders to the bully who runs away scared. All thank Don Felice, who reveals his identity and claims to have done all this misunderstanding and funny situations to entertain the audience watching him from a theater.

Cast
 Totò as Felice Sciosciammocca
 Ignazio Balsamo as Luigi
 Isa Barzizza as Giulietta
 Primarosa Battistella as Lisetta
 Liana Billi as Giuliana
 Carlo Campanini as Don Pasquale
 Anna Campori as Concettella
 Mario Castellani as L'onorevole Cocchetelli
 Dino Curcio as Michele
 Christiane Dury as Marion
 Franca Faldini as Angelica
 Amedeo Girard as Ignazio
 Aldo Giuffrè as Faina

References

External links

1953 films
1953 comedy films
1950s Italian-language films
Italian films based on plays
Films based on works by Eduardo Scarpetta
Films directed by Mario Mattoli
Films set in Naples
Films set in Sorrento
Films with screenplays by Ruggero Maccari
Italian comedy films
1950s Italian films